Part Monster is the ninth album by Piano Magic. It was released on 29 May 2007.

Track listing 

 The Last Engineer 5:38
 England's Always Better (As You're Pulling Away) 6:04
 Incurable (Reprise) 4:45
 Soldier Song 5:01
 The King Cannot Be Found 3:53
 Great Escapes 4:37
 Cities & Factories 5:16
 Halfway Through 4:11
 Saints Preserve Us 5:53
 Part Monster 2:58

2007 albums
Piano Magic albums
Important Records albums